Eugene Wasdon Lambert Sr. (October 23, 1905 – October 27, 2000) was an American football and basketball coach and college athletics administrator. He served as head basketball coach at North Texas Agricultural (now the University of Texas at Arlington), Kenyon, Arkansas, Memphis State, and Alabama. He served as head tennis coach in 1957 at the University of Alabama, and head football coach at both North Texas Agricultural and Kenyon.

Coaching career
After he graduated from Arkansas, Lambert coached at both Texarkana and Taylor High Schools before taking his first collegiate coaching position at North Texas Agricultural College in 1933. At North Texas, he coached both the basketball team and the football team which he led to an overall record of eleven wins, four losses and five ties (11–4–5). From North Texas, Lambert moved to Kenyon College where he again coached both the men's basketball and football teams. During his two-year tenure with the Lords, he led the basketball team to an overall record of 15 wins and 16 losses (15–16) and the football team to an overall record of six wins, seven losses and one tie (6–7–1).

From Kenyon, Lambert returned to Arkansas as an assistant coach and became the head coach for the 1942 season. While with the Razorbacks, he led Arkansas to an overall record of 113 wins and 60 losses (113–60), two Southwest Conference championships and invitations to three and appearances in two NCAA Tournaments. After he served for one year as the athletic director at Arkansas A&M, Lambert returned to the coaching ranks as the head coach at Memphis State. While with the Tigers, he led Memphis State to an overall record of 87 wins and 45 losses (87–45) two appearances in two NCAA Tournaments. In April 1956, Lambert was hired to serve as head coach at Alabama. While with the Crimson Tide, he led Alabama to an overall record of 49 wins and 49 losses (49–49). In 1957 Lambert also served as the head tennis coach for the Alabama Crimson Tide. He then resigned from Alabama in April 1960 to become athletic director at Memphis State. He remained as the Tigers' athletic director through his resignation in 1966.

Head coaching record

College football

College basketball

See also
 List of NCAA Division I Men's Final Four appearances by coach

References

External links
 

1905 births
2000 deaths
Alabama Crimson Tide men's basketball coaches
All-American college men's basketball players
American men's basketball players
Arkansas Razorbacks athletic directors
Arkansas Razorbacks men's basketball coaches
Arkansas Razorbacks men's basketball players
Arkansas–Monticello Boll Weevils and Cotton Blossoms athletic directors
Basketball coaches from Arkansas
Basketball players from Arkansas
Kenyon Lords basketball coaches
Kenyon Lords football coaches
Memphis Tigers athletic directors
Memphis Tigers men's basketball coaches
People from Searcy, Arkansas
Texas–Arlington Mavericks football coaches
UT Arlington Mavericks men's basketball coaches